The Pilot and His Wife (1874) is a novel by Norwegian author Jonas Lie.

Plot
The Pilot and His Wife portrays the life of the sailor both at home and abroad and describes varied experiences out on the stormy deep as well as in distant ports. The work is noted for its vigor of description. With a background of ocean waves, it is a story of married life.

Salve Kristiansen loves a beautiful woman named Elisabeth and is evidently loved in return. But for a time Elisabeth is attracted to a young officer who wishes to marry her. The old love for Salve prevails, however, and Elisabeth spurns the officer, but Salve has already left his native land in desperation and is sailing toward foreign shores. When he finally, after some years, returns to his old home, he finds that Elisabeth, after all, has been true to him. He marries her.

It would seem that all is well, but such is not the case. The thought of Elisabeth's momentary hesitation does not leave Salve, and this unfortunate circumstance makes life miserable for both. Ten years elapse before the husband and wife finally come to a clear understanding and a genuine appreciation of one another, and now at last are enabled to lay the foundation for a happy life together. The novel emphasizes the need of implicit confidence and trust, if two persons united in wedlock are to live happily together.

Notes

References

1874 novels
19th-century Norwegian novels
Norwegian-language novels